Coptotriche marginea is a moth of the family Tischeriidae. It is found in most of Europe.

The wingspan is 7–8 mm. Adults are brownish with a slight metallic sheen. Forewings ochreous-yellow; costa anteriorly narrowly, posteriorly broadly suffused with dark purplish-fuscous; termen suffused with dark purplish-fuscous; a dark fuscous tornal dot. Hindwings rather dark grey.

They are on wing from May to June and again in August.

The larvae feed on Rubus caesius, Rubus canescens, Rubus discolor, Rubus fruticosus, Rubus grabowskii, Rubus hypargyrus, Rubus idaeus, Rubus laciniatus, Rubus macrophyllus, Rubus nemorosus and Rubus saxatilis. They mine the leaves of their host plant. The mine has the form of a short corridor that widens into a long, elliptic blotch. The blotch is upper-surface and whitish to yellow-brown. The inside of the mine is lined with silk. The frass is ejected out of the mine through an opening in the underside of the mine. Pupation takes place within the mine in a pupa without a cocoon. Larvae can be found in June and again from September to March.

References

External links
 Swedish moths
 
 

Tischeriidae
Moths described in 1828
Moths of Europe
Insects of Turkey
Taxa named by Adrian Hardy Haworth